Spiritual Love may refer to:

Music
 Spiritual Love (album)

Film
 Spiritual Love (film), a 1987 film